Hyundai Blue Link (also branded as Genesis Connected Services) is a vehicle system that uses a mobile app from Hyundai to allow the user to retrieve information about their vehicle and perform some basic remote operations. Blue Link functionality varies based on the type of vehicle, as well as the type of cell service modem the vehicle is equipped with. In the United States, the Blue Link system debuted on the 2012 Hyundai Veloster as standard equipment, and has become an available feature on most Hyundai models sold since then. The service currently costs $99 a year and can be used for roadside service, information about the vehicle's performance, and remote start, stop, lock or unlock their Hyundai automobile.

Connectivity
Smartphones can connect to Hyundai Blue Link over Bluetooth or a USB cable with the Hyundai Blue Link mobile app. The in-car Hyundai Blue Link software checks for updates wirelessly everytime the vehicle turns on, keeping the included applications up to date. 

When Blue Link first launched, the connectivity was provided by a joint relationship of Aeris Communications, Inc. and Sprint Corp. On January 21, 2014 Hyundai announced it had selected Verizon Enterprise Solutions with integration provided by Opentext. The Opentext Business Network platform also supports other car manufacturers such as Land Rover/Jaguar, Daimler, Ford, General Motors and Mitsubishi. Hyundai announced that starting in 2022 model year 2012-2018 vehicles would no have Blue Link support due to the discontinuation of 2G and 3G cell service.

How Blue Link Works: 
Blue Link uses cellular and GPS technology to provide drivers with advanced safety, security, and convenience features. Here's how it works:

 Cellular Connectivity: Blue Link uses a cellular connection to communicate with the response center and provides drivers with advanced safety, security, and convenience features.
 GPS Tracking: Blue Link uses GPS technology to track the location of your vehicle and provide real-time information about the vehicle's location, speed, and direction.
 Vehicle Telematics: Blue Link uses a combination of sensors and software in a vehicle to gather and transmit data about the vehicle's health and status.

See also
 Microsoft Auto
 Ford Sync
 MyFord Touch
 Toyota Entune
 Kia Connect

References

External links

Blue Link
Vehicle telematics